Rilhac-Xaintrie is a commune in the Corrèze department and Nouvelle-Aquitaine region of central France.

Population

Etymology
The town first appears in charters in the eleventh century, as Rialiaco.

Sights
The castle, dating from the fifteenth and sixteenth centuries, is a historical site; however, the nineteenth-century building which adjoins it is not protected.

See also
 Communes of the Corrèze department

References

Communes of Corrèze